Lule is an indigenous language of northern Argentina.

Lule may be extinct today. Campbell (1997) writes that in 1981 there was an unconfirmed report that Lule is still spoken by 5 families in Resistencia in east-central Chaco Province.

It is unclear if it is the same language as Tonocoté.

Varieties
Unattested varieties classified by Loukotka (1968) as part of the Lule language cluster.

Tonocoté - once spoken on the Bermejo River near Concepción, Chaco.
Isistiné - once spoken on the Salado River near San Juan de Valbuena, Chaco.
Oristine - once spoken on the Salado River near San Juan de Valbuena, Chaco.
Toquistiné - once spoken on the Salado River near Miraflores.
Matará / Amulahí - once spoken near the city of the same name on the Salado River.
Jurí - extinct language of an agricultural tribe that lived on the Hondo and Salado Rivers, province of Santiago del Estero. The last survivors now speak only a Quechua dialect.

Genetic relations
Lule appears to be distantly related to the still-spoken Vilela language, together forming a small Lule–Vilela family. Kaufman (1990) finds this relationship likely and with general agreement among the major classifiers of South American languages. Viegas Barros published additional evidence 1996–2006. Zamponi (2008) and other authors consider Lule and Vilela two linguistic isolates.

There were three distinct groups known as Lulé:
The nomadic Lule of the plains, who in addition to their own language, spoke Tonocote, the local lingua franca and the language of Spanish catechism.
The sedentary Lule of the foothills, who were trilingual in Lule, Tonocote, and Quechua in addition to their original language, Cacán.
The Lule-Tonocote, whose language was recorded by Machoni.

Data
In 1586 Father Alonson Bárzana (Bárcena) wrote a grammar of Tonocote, which is now lost. In 1732 Antonio Maccioni (Machoni), who was not aware of Bárzana's grammar, wrote one of his own, Arte y vocabulario de la lengua lule y tonocoté ('Art and vocabulary of the language of the Lule and Tonocote') of the Lule-Tonocote language at the mission San Esteban de Miraflores. This is our primary data on the language. Métraux (1946) concluded that Lule and Tonocote were distinct, and perhaps unrelated, languages, and that the Tonocote at the Miraflores mission had shifted to the Lule language by the time of Machoni.

Machoni records a language with vowels  and few consonants. Final syllables are stressed. There are consonant clusters in initial and final position: quelpç  'I split', slimst  'I blow my nose', oalécst  'I know', stuç  'I throw'.

External links
 Proel: Lengua Lule
 Proel: Familia Lule–Vilela

Bibliography

 Campbell, Lyle. (1997). American Indian languages: The historical linguistics of Native America. New York: Oxford University Press. .
 Kaufman, Terrence. (1990). Language history in South America: What we know and how to know more. In D. L. Payne (Ed.), Amazonian linguistics: Studies in lowland South American languages (pp. 13–67). Austin: University of Texas Press. .
 Kaufman, Terrence. (1994). The native languages of South America. In C. Mosley & R. E. Asher (Eds.), Atlas of the world's languages (pp. 46–76). London: Routledge.
 Zamponi, Raoul. (2008). Sulla fonologia e la rappresentazione ortografica del lule. In A. Maccioni, Arte y Vocabulario de la lengua Lule y Tonocoté. (pp. xxi–lviii). Ed. by R. Badini, T. Deonette & S. Pineider. Cagliari: Centro di Studi Filologici Sardi. .

References

Lule–Vilela languages
Indigenous languages of the South American Chaco
Extinct languages of South America